Swallowed By the New is the ninth studio album (and fourth on a record label) released in 2016 by Glen Phillips.  The album spawned three singles: "Amnesty," "Leaving Oldtown," and "Go".  This album was inspired by Phillips' divorce and the aftermath of it.  A deluxe edition with a new track was released on May 4, 2018, by Compass Records.

Track listing
 "Go" – 4:16
 "Baptistina" – 3:22
 "Criminal Career" – 4:03
 "Leaving Oldtown" – 3:26
 "The Easy Ones" – 3:47
 "Amnesty" – 3:54
 "Grief and Praise" – 3:30
 "Unwritten" – 3:16
 "There's Always More" – 3:11
 "Held Up" – 3:31
 "Reconstructing the Diary" – 1:36
 "Nobody's Gonna Get Hurt"* – 4:07

– * (Only included on the 2018 re-release)

References

Glen Phillips albums
2016 albums
Compass Records albums